"Let It Shine"  is a 1973 single written by Nashville songwriter Linda Hargrove.

Olivia Newton-John's version

In 1975, Olivia Newton-John recorded a version which was released as the second and final single from her sixth studio album, Clearly Love.

In January 1976, the single went to number one on the US Easy Listening (adult contemporary) chart and number thirty on the Billboard Hot 100. "Let It Shine" peaked at number five on the US Country chart.  The B-side of "Let It Shine" was a cover of Bobby Scott-Bob Russell classic "He Ain't Heavy, He's My Brother".

Track listing
 "Let It Shine" - 2:26
 "He Ain't Heavy, He's My Brother" - 3:54

Charts

See also
List of number-one adult contemporary singles of 1976 (U.S.)

References

1973 singles
1975 singles
1976 singles
Olivia Newton-John songs
Songs written by Linda Hargrove
Song recordings produced by John Farrar
Elektra Records singles
MCA Records singles
1973 songs